Manna is the food produced for the Israelites in the desert, as described in the Biblical book of Exodus.

Manna may also refer to:
crystallized products of plant sap, especially when rich in sugars and used as a source of food by people or animals, in particular saps of:
 manna ash (Fraxinus ornus)
 European ash (Fraxinus excelsior)
 narrow-leafed ash (Fraxinus angustifolia)
Alhagi maurorum (Alhagi manna)
Eucalyptus or Australian manna:
Eucalyptus viminalis
Eucalyptus gunnii
Eucalyptus pulverulenta

People
 Manna (actor) (1964–2008), Bangladeshi film actor
 Gennaro Manna (1715–1779), Baroque opera composer
 Zohar Manna (1939–2018), American computer scientist
 Manna Dey Indian singer

Places
 Manna (city), a town in Bengkulu, Indonesia
 Manna, or Mannea, ancient Land of Mannaeans, in present-day northwestern Iran
 Manna, Banmauk, a village in Burma
 Manna, Greece, a village in Corinthia, Greece

Other
 the Gothic word for "man", related to 
the mannaz rune
 Manna Aviation, an Australian aircraft manufacturer
 Operation Manna, the RAF food droppings in the West of the Netherlands at the end off WW2
 Operation Manna, a World War II British airborne operation in Greece
 Manam (film), a 2014 Telugu language film
 Manna (horse), winner of the 1925 Epsom Derby
 Manna (gymnastics), a gymnastics skill
 Manna (album), a 1971 album by the band Bread
 Manna (novel), a novel by Marshall Brain
 "Manna" (short story), a story by Peter Phillips published in 1949
 Manna (cicada), a genus of cicadas

See also
 Mana (disambiguation)